Mahakuli Mahatissa a.k.a. Maha Cula Maha Tissa was King of Anuradhapura in the 1st century BC, who ruled from 76 BC to 62 BC. He succeeded his adopted father Valagamba as King of Anuradhapura and was succeeded by his cousin Chora Naga.

See also
 List of Sri Lankan monarchs
 History of Sri Lanka

References

External links
 Kings & Rulers of Sri Lanka
 Codrington's Short History of Ceylon

M
M
 Sinhalese Buddhist monarchs
M
M